Gymnoceros pallidula is a moth in the family Depressariidae. It was described by Turner in 1946. It is found in Australia, where it has been recorded from Queensland.

The wingspan is 28–30 mm. The forewings are pale pinkish-grey with numerous scattered minute fuscous dots and the costa is pale pinkish with the extreme edge whitish. A small  fuscous median discal spot is found at three-fifths. The hindwings are whitish.

References

Moths described in 1946
Depressariinae